Modern Times is the sixth album by Jefferson Starship and was released in 1981. Grace Slick appeared on this album after a three-year absence. She returned near the end of the recording sessions, providing background vocals on some tracks as well as lead vocals on the single "Stranger" as a duet with lead singer Mickey Thomas.  "Stranger" had previously been performed live by Jefferson Starship as early as December 1979, and the first studio version was made for Modern Times.  Although not appearing in the band picture on the gatefold cover, Slick is listed on the back cover of the LP with the credit "Introducing Grace Slick" and her picture is on the lyric sleeve with the note "Grace Slick courtesy of Grace Slick." She joined the band officially for the 1981 tour. MTV debuted in 1981 and this was the first Jefferson Starship album to have promotional music videos. It was also the first album to feature a charting single on the Mainstream Rock Tracks chart, which had premiered earlier in the year. The single "Find Your Way Back" reached No. 3 on the Mainstream Rock chart.

The song "Stairway to Cleveland" was inspired by a harsh review that Rolling Stone had given the album Freedom at Point Zero, inspiring Paul Kantner to wrap lyrics around a phrase he had heard from Paul Warren: "Fuck you! We do what we want!"

Track listing

Personnel 
 Mickey Thomas – lead (all tracks) and backing vocals, spoken word (9)
 Paul Kantner – lead (9) and backing vocals, rhythm guitar, Oberheim 8-voice synthesizer (9), keyboards (2), spoken word (9)
 Craig Chaquico – lead guitar, rhythm guitar, synthesizer (1, 6, 7), steel drums (6), spoken word (9)
 David Freiberg – bass (1, 6, 8), piano (2), synthesizer (2, 5), organ (3), backing vocals, spoken word (9)
 Pete Sears – bass (2-5, 7, 9), piano (1, 3, 4, 8), synthesizer (2, 4, 8), Moog (8)
 Aynsley Dunbar – drums, percussion, marimba (6), synthesizer (7)
 Grace Slick – co-lead vocals (2), backing vocals on (3, 4, 8, 9)

Production 
 Ron Nevison – producer for Gadget Productions, Inc., engineer
 Michael Clink – engineer
 Mike Reese – mastering
 Pat Ieraci (Maurice) – production coordinator
 Bill Murphy / Rod Dyer, Inc. – album design, art direction
 Ryoko Ishioka – cover concept
 Monica Clemans – cover model and eyes
 Leon LeCash – photography
 Bill Thompson – manager
 Recorded and mixed at The Record Plant, Los Angeles - Sausalito
 Mastered at The Mastering Lab, Hollywood

Singles / Music Videos 
 "Find Your Way Back" (1981) #29 US
 "Stranger" (1981) #48 US
 "Save Your Love" (1981) #104 US (single only / no music video)
 "Stairway to Cleveland" (1981) (promo single only)

Charts

Weekly charts

Year-end charts

Certifications

References 

Jefferson Starship albums
1981 albums
Albums produced by Ron Nevison
Albums recorded at Record Plant (Los Angeles)
Grunt Records albums
RCA Records albums